The Colonial Germantown Historic District is a designated National Historic Landmark District in the Germantown and Mount Airy neighborhoods of Philadelphia, Pennsylvania along both sides of Germantown Avenue. This road followed a Native American path from the Delaware River just north of Old City Philadelphia, through Germantown, about 6 miles northwest of Center City Philadelphia, and on to Pottstown. Settlement in the Germantown area began, at the invitation of William Penn, in 1683 by Nederlanders and Germans under the leadership of Francis Daniel Pastorius fleeing religious persecution.

Colonial Germantown was a leader in religious thought, printing, and education. Important dates in Germantown's early history include:
August 16, 1683, Pastorius arrives in Philadelphia
October 25, 1683, Lots are drawn for land among Pastorius's followers and settlement begins
1688, first American anti-slavery protest published 
1690, first paper-mill built in America is built near Germantown
1705, possibly the first portrait painted in oil in America painted by Christopher Witt in Germantown
1708, first Mennonite Meetinghouse in America built in Germantown
1719, first Dunkards in America arrive in Germantown
1743, first Bible printed in America in any European language (in this case German), printed by Christoph Sauer
1760, Germantown Academy founded
1762, invasion of the Paxton Boys
1770, first American book on pedagogy written by Christopher Dock and published in Germantown
October 4, 1777, Battle of Germantown
1793, during the Philadelphia Yellow Fever Epidemic, President Washington and his cabinet move to Germantown
1794, Washington spends two months in Germantown to avoid the heat in Philadelphia
July 20, 1825, General Lafayette visits Germantown
June 6, 1832, railroad from Philadelphia to Germantown opens

Historic designation and extent
The district was designated a National Historic Landmark in 1965 and was added to the National Register of Historic Places in 1966. The original district included the 4500 to 6600 blocks of Germantown Avenue (between Windrim Avenue and Sharpnack Street).  In 1987 the district was expanded north to the 7600 block of Germantown Avenue (up to Cresheim Valley Drive), which is the southern boundary of the Chestnut Hill Historic District.  The district's two parts contain 579 properties, of which 514 are considered contributing, and only 65  non-contributing. The northwest Philadelphia area, which promotes itself as "Freedom's Backyard," contains 11 historic districts listed by the National Register of Historic Places, as well as 58 separately listed properties. Eight state historical markers are located on Germantown Avenue. Nearly complete inventories prepared for the National Register of Historic Places, both for the original district and for the expanded area are available. A 1907 inventory of historic buildings in the area was printed in the "History of Old Germantown."

Selected contributing properties

Contributing properties in the district include the following.  Even street numbers are on the west side of Germantown Avenue, odd numbers on the east. Original construction dates may be approximate.

See also

 Awbury Historic District
 Chestnut Hill Historic District
 RittenhouseTown Historic District
 Tulpehocken Station Historic District
 List of National Historic Landmarks in Philadelphia
 National Register of Historic Places listings in Northwest Philadelphia

References

Further reading
 Sociological study set on Germantown Avenue

External links

1982 National Register of Historic Places Inventory--Nomination Form, Addendum to Colonial Germantown Historic District at Bryn Mawr College
 at Bryn Mawr College

Videos
Germantown History, 2010, VisitPhilly, YouTube.
Down Germantown Avenue, Part One, 2007, James Flatley and Etienne Jackson with Robert Wood, YouTube. Student film travels from Chestnut Hill south.
Down Germantown Avenue, Part Two, 2007, James Flatley and Etienne Jackson with Robert Wood, YouTube. From Chelten Avenue south

National Historic Landmarks in Pennsylvania
Federal architecture in Pennsylvania
Georgian architecture in Pennsylvania
National Register of Historic Places in Philadelphia
Historic districts in Philadelphia
Germantown, Philadelphia
Mount Airy, Philadelphia
Historic districts on the National Register of Historic Places in Pennsylvania
1683 establishments in Pennsylvania